Rous Lench may refer to:
Rous Lench, New South Wales, a heritage-listed homestead in Muswellbrook, Australia
Rous Lench, Worcestershire, a village in the United Kingdom